Hildred is a surname and given name. Notable people with the name include:

Given name:
Hildred Blewett (1911–2004), Canadian accelerator physicist
Hildred Mary Butler (1906–1975), Australian microbiologist
Hildred Carlile, CBE (1852–1942), English businessman and Conservative Party politician
Hildred Geertz (born 1927), American anthropologist, studied Balinese and Javanese kinship practices
Hildred Goodwine (1918–1998), artist, sculptor and illustrator

Surname:
Florence Taylor Hildred (1865–1932), pastor, and the first female member of Leeds Astronomical Society
Wayne Hildred (born 1955), New Zealand former racing cyclist
William Hildred, CB, OBE (1893–1986), British civil servant, Director-General of the International Air Traffic Association

See also
Hilde (disambiguation)
Hiltrud
Hiltrudia